John Henry Pentecost (15 October 1857 – 23 February 1902) was an English professional cricketer who played for Kent County Cricket Club between 1882 and 1890.

Pentecost was born at Brighton in 1857 and made his Kent debut in 1882 against Yorkshire at Bramall Lane, Sheffield. He played primarily as a wicket-keeper, making 63 of his 66 first-class cricket appearances for the county, making 124 dismissals. Writing in Wisden in 1907 George Marsham described him as "not a very brilliant wicket-keeper" but "a very plucky one" and Pentecost was forced to stop playing earlier than would have been normal due to "failing eyesight".

After being awarded his county cap in 1885, Pentecost was awarded a benefit match in 1892 and was a member of the ground staff at Lord's. He died at St John's Wood in London in February 1902 aged 44.

Notes

References

External links

1855 births
1902 deaths
English cricketers
Kent cricketers
Marylebone Cricket Club cricketers
North v South cricketers